Kingswood Oxford School is a private school located in West Hartford, Connecticut instructing day students in grades 6 through 12 with a college preparatory curriculum. Originally two separate schools, Kingswood School and Oxford School for boys and girls respectively, KO is now a co-educational institution.  KO employs 75 teachers as well as administrative, library, building and grounds, and culinary staff.

History

Kingswood Oxford School was formed by the merger of two independent schools: Oxford School for girls, founded in 1909 by Mary Martin, and Kingswood School, founded by George R.H. Nicholson in 1916. Martin and Nicholson founded their schools on the premise that "wise parents know they must share with teachers the shaping of the minds and character of young people" as first expressed by The American Country Day School Journal in the early 1900s.

Martin opened Oxford School in 1909 in her home on Oxford Street in Hartford's West End. In 1924, the School moved to 695 Prospect Ave. in West Hartford. The Prospect Street site became the permanent home of Oxford and served as the home for Kingswood Oxford's Middle School until the new Estes Family Building for the Middle School opened on the same campus as the Upper School in 2003. In the summer of 2007 KO expanded and improved the dining facility and added the multisport (football, lacrosse, soccer, field hockey and softball) artificial turf field. In 2008 construction began on the new Chase-Tallwood Science Math Technology Center, which was completed at the commencement of the 2009 school year coinciding with the School's Centennial Celebration.

Nicholson established the Kingswood School seven years later. He named the School for his alma mater, the Kingswood School based in Bath, England. The new Kingswood School inherited some of the traditions of the English school, including the School's crest, motto, colors (black and crimson) and distinctive symbol, the wyvern. The wyvern is a mythical creature said to have two legs, two clawed wings and a serpent's tail.

Upon the merger in 1969, the combined institution took the name Kingswood-Oxford School, as originally hyphenated. At the time of the merger, Kingswood Oxford adopted the Oxford School motto: Vincit qui se vincit (One conquers by conquering oneself). Kingswood's motto had been "In via recta celeriter" (In the right direction swiftly). In 2010, the School dropped the hyphen from its name, making it Kingswood Oxford School.

The current Head of School, Thomas Dillow, joined Kingswood Oxford in 2018.

Academics
KO students continually score well on Advanced Placement exams; the school is one of the top achievers on AP tests among Connecticut high schools.

The school has also been voted the best prep school in the West Hartford area for the ninth consecutive time in the May 2017 edition of the Hartford Courant.

Kingswood Oxford students also continually score well within the National Merit Scholarship Program

Extracurricular activities

Student groups at KO range from a newspaper (the KO News), a literary magazine called epic and a student-run yearbook to multicultural and community-service organizations.

KO's debate and public speaking club, the Forensic Union, has been consistently winning tournaments in the Debating Association of New England Independent Schools for over twenty years and has placed highly in international competitions including the World Individual Debating and Public Speaking Championship.

There are also numerous performing groups (part of the required arts program), including the Octopipers, a selective group of eighth-grade girls that began in Oxford; F2B, a selective chorus group for Middle School boys; the sixth-grade Upper Prep Choraliers; Crimson 7, an a cappella group of Upper School boys; Voce Novissima, an elite all-girls' Upper School choir; Middle and Upper School mixed choruses; Middle and Upper School Concert Band; and the Jazz Ensemble in both the Middle School and Upper School.  Kingswood Oxford has both a Middle School and Upper School string orchestra as well.

Notable alumni & faculty

Tim Brennan, lead guitarist of the Dropkick Murphys
E. Michael Burke, former President of the New York Yankees, the New York Knicks, and Madison Square Garden
Kate Cheney Chappell, co-founder of Tom's of Maine
John Conklin, theater designer
Dominick Dunne, investigative journalist
Colin McEnroe, columnist and radio personality
Tarik Ergin, actor
Brendan Gill, writer for The New Yorker
Marion Coats Graves (faculty in 1910),  first president of Sarah Lawrence College
Katharine Hepburn, actress 
Katharine Houghton, actress and playwright
Jared Jordan, professional basketball player
Nancy Lublin, founder and former CEO of Crisis Text Line, former CEO of DoSomething, creator of Dress for Success
John O'Hurley, actor and former host of Family Feud
William A. Tomasso, construction executive
Isaiah Wright, professional football player

References

Buildings and structures in West Hartford, Connecticut
Schools in Hartford County, Connecticut
Private high schools in Connecticut
Educational institutions established in 1909
Private middle schools in Connecticut
Preparatory schools in Connecticut
1909 establishments in Connecticut